Alec Cameron was an Australian professional soccer player who played as a forward and captained the Australia national soccer team.

Club career
Cameron had played his entire senior career with Adamstown. He scored 23 goals during the 1930 league season, won the Northern NSW state league and the Double Cup. He scored the first goal in Adamstown's 2–0 win over Cessnock in 1930. He won further Premierships in 1934 and 1935.

After Cameron playing with Adamstown for 15 years he joined Weston on a three-year deal on 3 March 1937.

International career
Cameron began his international career with Australia in an international friendly, debuting in a 4–2 win over New Zealand on 5 June 1933. He scored his first international goal two weeks later against New Zealand in a 6–4 win. He continued his international career with Australia in 1936 and was captain for three more international matches against New Zealand, and scored five more goals in the three-match series in 1936.

Around the time where Cameron signed for Weston he played in Australia's historic tour against an English FA touring side in 1937.

Career statistics

International

Scores and results list Australia's goal tally first, score column indicates score after each Australia goal.

References

Australian soccer players
Australia international soccer players
Association football forwards
Year of birth unknown
Year of death unknown